The 1989 NCAA Women's Division I Swimming and Diving Championships were contested at the eighth annual NCAA-sanctioned swim meet to determine the team and individual national champions of Division I women's collegiate swimming and diving in the United States. 

This year's events were hosted at the Indiana University Natatorium in Indianapolis, Indiana. 

Stanford topped the team standings, finishing just 63.5 points ahead of five-time defending champions Texas; it was the Cardinal's second overall title and first since 1983.

Team standings
Note: Top 10 only
(DC) = Defending champions
Full results

See also
List of college swimming and diving teams

References

NCAA Division I Swimming And Diving Championships
NCAA Division I Swimming And Diving Championships
NCAA Division I Women's Swimming and Diving Championships